The Year of Sir Ivor is a 1969 documentary about the racehorse Sir Ivor. It was distributed by Anglo Amalgamated.

References

External links

1969 films
Documentary films about horse racing
1969 documentary films
British horse racing films
1960s British films